Hobo Station is an unincorporated community in Prentiss County, Mississippi, United States.

History
Hobo Station was named for a shanty built at a rural intersection where hitchhikers would wait for passing motorists.

References

Unincorporated communities in Prentiss County, Mississippi
Unincorporated communities in Mississippi